Maximiliano Ferraro (born 4 November 1975) is an Argentine politician who has served as National Deputy for Buenos Aires and is the Chairman of the Civic Coalition ARI.

Political career
From 2005 to 2007 he was chief advisor to national deputy Elisa Carrió. Between 2007 and 2011 he was also the Undersecretary of Coordination of the Buenos Aires Legislature.

Ferraro was elected Legislator of the City of Buenos Aires in 2011 and reelected in 2015 under the ECO alliance.

On December 15, 2018, Ferraro was elected president of the Civic Coalition ARI succeeding Mariana Zuvic, and during the Argentine legislative elections of 2019 he was elected national deputy for the City of Buenos Aires under the Cambiemos ticket.

An openly gay man, Ferraro is known for his work regarding social legislation and LGBTQ rights.

References

1975 births
Living people
Politicians from Buenos Aires
Members of the Buenos Aires City Legislature
Members of the Argentine Chamber of Deputies elected in Buenos Aires
Civic Coalition ARI politicians
Argentine LGBT politicians
Argentine gay men
Gay politicians